Joe Maddison's War is a 2010 television film written by Alan Plater about strained family and social relations in wartime. Directed by Patrick Collerton and filmed partly on location in South Shields, it presents a view of World War II through the eyes of shipyard worker and World War I veteran Joe Maddison (played by Kevin Whately) who serves in the Home Guard during the Blitz while his son and son-in-law are enlisted for oversea service.

Cast (main)
 Kevin Whately as Joe Maddison
 Sammy Dobson as Sheila Maddison
 Angela Lonsdale as Polly Maddison
 James Baxter as Alan Maddison
 John Woodvine as Father Connolly
 James Atherton as Tommy Cowell
 Robson Green as Harry Crawford
 Melanie Hill as Selina Rutherford
 Trevor Fox as Eddie Turnbull
 Nick Versteeg as Billy Nicholson
 Derek Jacobi as Major Simpson
 Jackie Phillips as Lily Parkinson
 Madelaine Newton as Jenny Barlow
 Charlie Richmond as Sergeant Bull

References

External links
 
 Sweeting, Adam: Writer Alan Plater on Joe Maddison's War at The Daily Telegraph, 15 October 2010

2010 television films
2010 films
British television films
British World War II films